Yu Jing (born 22 September 1983) is a Chinese ice sledge hockey player.

At the 2022 Winter Paralympics, Yu became the third female para ice hockey player at the Winter Paralympic Games after Norwegians Britt Mjaasund Øyen and Lena Schrøder and the first Chinese woman to do so. She was also a member of China's bronze medal-winning team in para ice hockey at the 2022 Winter Paralympics, thus becoming the second woman to win a Paralympic medal in this sport.

References

1983 births
Living people
Chinese sledge hockey players
Chinese women's ice hockey forwards
Paralympic sledge hockey players of China
Paralympic bronze medalists for China
Paralympic medalists in sledge hockey
Para ice hockey players at the 2022 Winter Paralympics
Medalists at the 2022 Winter Paralympics